Bhanotia nuda (naked pipefish) is a marine fish of the family Syngnathidae. It is found in the western central Pacific, near Palau and southeastern Papua New Guinea. This species is ovoviviparous, with the males carrying eggs in brood pouches until they are ready to hatch.

References

Further reading

Encyclopedia of Life
ITIS Report

Syngnathidae
Fish described in 1978